Ming Dynasty in 1566 is a Chinese television series based on the events in the reign of the Jiajing Emperor of the Ming dynasty. It was first broadcast on Hunan TV in China in 2007.

Cast

 Chen Baoguo as the Jiajing Emperor
 Huang Zhizhong as Hai Rui
 Ni Dahong as Yan Song
 Zhang Zhijian as Yan Shifan
 Guo Guangping as Prince Yu (the future Longqing Emperor)
 Yan Ni as Consort Li
 Xiao Zhu as Xu Jie
 Liu Yubin as Gao Gong
 Guo Dongwen as Zhang Juzheng
 Wang Qingxiang as Hu Zongxian
 Xu Guangming as Lü Fang
 Liu Liwei as Chen Hong
 Wang Jinsong as Yang Jinshui
 Zhao Yong as Huang Jin
 Xu Chengfeng as Feng Bao
 Zheng Yu as Wang Yongji
 Xu Min as Zhao Zhenji
 Gan Yu as Zheng Michang
 Wang Rong as He Maocai
 Chen Zhihui as Qi Jiguang
 Wang Yajie as Yunniang
 Tan Kai as Gao Hanwen
 Zhao Lixin as Shen Yishi
 Zhu Xiaojuan as Hai Rui's mother
 Hu Lingling as Hai Rui's wife
 Lin Haiyun as Hai Rui's daughter
 Zhang Zijian as Li Shizhen
 Jin Song as Qi Dazhu
 Miura Kenichi as Inoue Jūsanro

References

External links
  Da Ming Wangchao 1566 on Sina.com

2007 Chinese television series debuts
Television series set in the Ming dynasty
Mandarin-language television shows
Chinese historical television series
Television series set in the 16th century